This is a list of episodes for The Daily Show in 1996. It covers shows hosted by Craig Kilborn.

1996

July

August

September

October

November

December

References

 
Daily Show guests (1996-98)
1996 American television seasons